Marquez Fernandez (born September 7, 1992) is an American professional soccer player who plays as a midfielder.

Career

College and Youth
Fernandez was raised in Baltimore, Maryland, and played four years of high school soccer for the McDonogh School in Owings Mills. In 2010, Fernandez began attending the University of Maryland, though he redshirted his true freshman year. After his redshirt, Fernandez appeared in 15 matches for the Terrapins in 2011 and 2012.

Fernandez transferred to the University of Maryland-Baltimore County before the 2013 season, where he became an integral part of the Retrievers back line. Fernandez played in 41 games (starting 40) over the 2013 and 2014 seasons with UMBC.

During his time in college, Fernandez became a defensive stalwart for local Premier Development League squad Baltimore Bohemians. Fernandez appeared in 38 matches for the amateur side during the college offseason. During the 2013 PDL season, Fernandez earned PDL Player of the Week honors for his two goals for the Bohs during a 2–2 draw with Jersey Express S.C.

Tampa Bay Rowdies
On 23 February 2015 it was announced that Fernandez had signed his first professional contract with Tampa Bay Rowdies of the North American Soccer League. Fernandez scored a goal for the Rowdies during a 5-0 closed-door scrimmage victory over the Guelph Gryphons, a Canadian college team. His first official appearance with the Rowdies was as a substitute in the closing minutes of a 2–1 win against FC Edmonton on June 6, 2015. He was released in November 2015.

References

External links 
 Tampa Bay Rowdies Profile.

1992 births
Living people
American soccer players
Maryland Terrapins men's soccer players
UMBC Retrievers men's soccer players
Baltimore Bohemians players
Tampa Bay Rowdies players
Association football midfielders
Soccer players from Maryland
USL League Two players
North American Soccer League players